Pardomima pompusalis is a moth in the family Crambidae. It was described by Francis Walker in 1859. It is found in Australia, where it has been recorded from Queensland.

References

Moths described in 1859
Spilomelinae